Lusitropy is the rate of myocardial relaxation. The increase in cytosolic calcium of cardiomyocytes via increased uptake leads to increased myocardial contractility (positive inotropic effect), but the myocardial relaxation, or lusitropy, decreases.  This should not be confused, however, with catecholamine-induced calcium uptake into the sarcoplasmic reticulum, which increases lusitropy.


Positive
Increased catecholamine levels promote positive lusitropy, enabling the heart to relax more rapidly. This effect is mediated by the phosphorylation of phospholamban and troponin I via a cAMP-dependent pathway.  Catecholamine-induced calcium influx into the sarcoplasmic reticulum increases both inotropy and lusitropy.  In other words, a quicker reduction in cytosolic calcium levels (because the calcium enters the sarcoplasmic reticulum) causes an increased rate of relaxation (+ lusitropy), however that also enables a greater degree of calcium efflux, back into the cytosol, when the next action potential arrives, thereby increasing inotropy as well.  Do not confuse this calcium mechanism with calcium uptake from the extracellular fluid.  Increased calcium uptake from the extracellular fluid into the cytoplasm decreases lusitropy in the absence of catecholamine stimulation, but increased calcium uptake into the sarcoplasmic reticulum, via catecholamines, increases lusitropy and inotropy.

Negative
Relaxation of the heart is negatively impacted by the following factors:

 Calcium overload – too much intracellular calcium
 Reduced rate of calcium removal from myocyte through pumps if calcium is not removed from the cell quickly enough.
 a. Plasma membrane Calcium ATPase (Ca ATPase) this primary active transporter pumps calcium out of the myocyte between beats
 b. Sodium-Calcium (Na/Ca) exchanger this secondary active transporter pumps calcium out of cell between beats
 Impaired Sarco-Endoplasmic Reticulum Calcium ATPase (SERCA) this primary active transporter pumps calcium from the cytoplasm of the myocyte into its sarco-endoplasmic reticulum.

Therefore, any impairment of the transporters in (2) and (3) would have a negative lusitropic effect.

In contrast, enhancement of these same transporters would have a positive inotropic effect

References 
 https://www.hu.liu.se/lakarprogr/t2/t2-filer/1.59634/Lusitropy.pdf
 

Cardiovascular physiology